Wilhelm Kraiker (4 August 1899 – 24 April 1987) was a German classical archaeologist.

Life 
Born in Frankfurt, in 1927 Kraiker received his doctorate at Heidelberg University under Ludwig Curtius. From June 1941 to September 1944, Kraiker worked in Athens during the German occupation in World War II for the newly formed Kunstschutz, which was subordinate to the Army High Command Quartermaster General Eduard Wagner, and was in charge from July 1942. Together with the German Archaeological Institute in Athens and the Foreign Office, this art protection department succeeded in driving the Reichsleiter Rosenberg Taskforce out of Greece. In 1943 Kraiker was appointed extraordinary professor at the University of Innsbruck. Since May 1, 1948 Kraiker represented the professorship for classical archaeology at the University of Kiel. On 1 January 1949 he was appointed full professor and at the same time director of the Antikensammlung Kiel. In 1968 he became emeritus.

Kraiker's best-known work is the Griechenlandkunde (1st edition 1955), which was written with Ernst Kirsten and which emerged from guide sheets of the German art protection for soldiers during the Second World War. The work was completely revised and reprinted in 1962.

Kraiker died in Rome aged 87.

Publications 
 Die Nekropolen des 12. bis 10. Jahrhunderts.
 Hellas Kunst der Griechen.
 Aigina, die Vasen des 10. bis 7. Jahrhunderts v. Chr.
 Die rotfigurigen attischen Vasen.
 Griechenlandkunde : ein Führer zu klassischen Stätten.

Literature 
 Julia Freifrau Hiller von Gaertringen: Deutsche Archäologische Unternehmungen im besetzten Griechenland 1941–1944. in Athenische Mitteilungen. 110, 1995, .

References

External links 
 

Classical archaeologists
20th-century archaeologists 
Academic staff of the University of Innsbruck
Academic staff of the University of Kiel
1899 births
1987 deaths
Archaeologists from Frankfurt